Omar Zepeda de Léon (born 8 July 1977) is a Mexican race walker. He finished sixth in the 50 km race at the 2005 World Championships in a personal best time of 3:49:01 hours. He was the bronze medalist in the 50 kilometres walk at the 2007 Pan American Games.

Also he won the team silver medal with Mexico over 50 km at the 2008 IAAF World Race Walking Cup in Cheboksary, Russia. He has competed at the World Championships in Athletics on six occasions and was 21st over 50 km at the 2011 edition. He won the 50 km race at the Chihuahua meeting on the 2012 IAAF World Race Walking Challenge tour.

Personal bests

Track walk
10,000 m: 40:26.68 min –  Monterrey, 4 July 2004
20,000 m: 1:27:57.5 hrs (ht) –  Bergen, 3 May 1997

Road walk
20 km: 1:21:59 min –  Poděbrady, 19 April 1997
50 km: 3:47:35 hrs –  Taicang, 3 May 2014

Achievements

References

External links

Sports reference biography

1977 births
Living people
Mexican male racewalkers
Athletes (track and field) at the 2003 Pan American Games
Athletes (track and field) at the 2007 Pan American Games
Athletes (track and field) at the 2012 Summer Olympics
Athletes (track and field) at the 2016 Summer Olympics
Olympic athletes of Mexico
Sportspeople from the State of Mexico
Pan American Games bronze medalists for Mexico
Pan American Games medalists in athletics (track and field)
Central American and Caribbean Games silver medalists for Mexico
Competitors at the 2014 Central American and Caribbean Games
Central American and Caribbean Games medalists in athletics
Medalists at the 2007 Pan American Games
21st-century Mexican people